Richard O'Donnell (born 1988) is an English footballer.

Richard O'Donnell may also refer to:
Richard O'Donnell (playwright) (born 1956), American playwright
Richard O'Donnell (American football) (1900–1947), American football player